Weinmannia apurimacensis is a species of plant in the family Cunoniaceae. It is endemic to Peru.

References

apurimacensis
Endemic flora of Peru
Trees of Peru
Vulnerable flora of South America
Taxonomy articles created by Polbot